John Edward Cariani (born July 23, 1969) is an American actor and playwright. Cariani is best known as the forensic expert Julian Beck in Law & Order. On stage, he earned a Tony Award nomination for his role as Motel the Tailor in the 2004 Broadway revival of Fiddler on the Roof, and he wrote the play Almost, Maine, a very popular play to produce in American schools. He starred on Broadway in the Tony Award winning musicals Something Rotten! and The Band's Visit.

Early life
Born in Brockton, Massachusetts, Cariani was eight when his family moved to Presque Isle, Maine.

He attended Presque Isle High School where he was active in the music and theater programs. After graduating in 1987, he attended
Amherst College, where he was a member of the Zumbyes, Amherst's oldest a-cappella group, and the Glee Club. After graduating from Amherst College in 1991 with a B.A. in history, he studied acting and directing at now defunct StageWest in Springfield, Massachusetts. He then moved to New York at age 27 to pursue acting.

Career
Cariani spent his early years in New York working with the Hudson Valley Shakespeare Festival, and acting in Off-Broadway plays, television commercials, and films.

His first break came in 1999 when he was cast in the Off-Broadway play It's My Party (and I'll Die if I Want To), starring F. Murray Abraham and Joyce Van Patten.

Cariani broke into film and TV in 2000 when he was cast in the independent film,Scotland, PA, opposite Christopher Walken and guest-starred on the TV series Ed 

In 2001, he landed his first major film role opposite Robert De Niro in the Warner Brothers' film Showtime (2002)

In 2002, he joined the cast of Law & Order, playing the role of forensic expert Julian Beck from 2002–2007.

Since then, he has appeared in several TV shows, films, plays and musicals, both on and off-Broadway, and in regional theaters across the country.

Playwriting
As playwright, Cariani is best known for his first play, Almost, Maine, which was developed at the Cape Cod Theatre Project in 2002. It premiered at Portland Stage Company (in Portland, Maine) in 2004. Almost, Maine opened Off-Broadway in 2006  and was featured in Smith and Kraus' New Playwrights: Best Plays of 2006."

The play was published by Dramatists Play Service in 2007  and has since become one of the most popular plays in the United States with nearly 100 professional productions and over 5000 community, university, and high school productions to date.

Over the past decade, it has become one of the most frequently produced plays in North American high schools. 

In 2014, Transport Group revived Almost, Maine Off-Broadway to critical acclaim. The Advocate named the production to its "Best Theatre of 2014" list, and Lincoln Center recorded the production for its Theatre on Film and Tape Archive.

Dramatists Play Service recently published its 80th Anniversary Edition, a boxed set of 8 definitive titles representing each decade of the Play Service's history. Almost, Maine was selected to represent DPS' eighth decade.

In 2020, Cariani adapted Almost, Maine into a novel, Almost, Maine: A Novel, published by Macmillan.

Cariani's second play, cul-de-sac premiered Off-Broadway in April 2006 in a Transport Group production. The New York Times described cul-de-sac as "charming, witty and macabre." The play was reworked and presented at the American Academy of Dramatic Arts (New York City) and at High Point University (High Point, NC) in 2016 and received further development at the Cape Cod Theatre Project. It received a professional production at Half Theatre in Poughkeepsie in 2016.

Cariani's third play, Last Gas premiered at Portland Stage Company (Portland, Maine) in 2010. Cariani noted that "Almost, Maine is almost a love letter to northern Maine and Last Gas is a more realistic look at that part of the world." It has been described as "a bittersweet romance about two people who lack the courage to admit they love one another ... it's an undeniable winner despite its predictable twist." The play ran at Opera House Arts, Stonington Opera House, Maine, in 2013 and at Geva Theatre Center in Rochester, New York in the winter of 2014. It was published by Dramatists Play Service in 2014.LOVE/SICK is Cariani's most recent play. It premiered at High Point University in the fall of 2010, then was presented at the Portland Stage Company in the spring of 2013, and was produced by Hartford TheaterWorks in 2014. The play ran Off-Broadway in February 2015 at the Royal Family Performing Arts Space. The Huffington Post gave the Off Broadway production a positive review: “Sometimes playwright John Cariani looks at the world — actually the worlds of love and relationships — through rose-colored glasses. Just as often he views those worlds through lenses tinted a middling-to-dark-gray or maybe a jaundiced yellow. … While poking fun at the happily-ever-after notion by means of a strong dose of happily-never-after, Cariani shoots his cockeyed valentines with a quiver full of funny lines. He knows how to keep audiences laughing while passing along disappointing news.”LOVE/SICK has been performed in Riga, Latvia  and Mexico City and was recently made into a Spanish language feature called Enfermo Amor'' on Vix+.

Personal life
Cariani and his husband John Lloyd, a retired NYPD detective, have been together since 1999 and live in the Bronx.

Filmography

Film roles

Television

Stage appearances

Awards and nominations

Playwriting bibliography

References

External links
 
 
 

1969 births
Male actors from Maine
Male actors from Massachusetts
20th-century American dramatists and playwrights
American male musical theatre actors
American male television actors
Amherst College alumni
Living people
Writers from Brockton, Massachusetts
People from Presque Isle, Maine
Singers from Massachusetts